The PS Alpena was a sidewheel steamer built by Thomas Arnold of Gallagher & Company at Marine City, Michigan in 1866. She was operated by the Goodrich Line after being purchased from Gardner, Ward & Gallagher in April 1868. The Alpena sank in Lake Michigan in the "Big Blow" storm on October 15, 1880, with the loss of all on board.

Construction

It was rated at 654 tons displacement. The vessel was driven by a steam engine, and photographs of the vessel show its walking beam suspended above the paddlewheels.

Sinking

At least 80 people died when the ship, also carrying a large cargo of apples, capsized in the middle of the lake. The ship was on a trip from Grand Haven, Michigan, to Chicago, Illinois, and was spotted at 8:00 am on October 16 in heavy seas. Some time later, probably due to a shift in the cargo on deck caused by the waves, it capsized and drifted northwest. On the 17th, debris including a piano came ashore in Holland, Michigan, while apples and wood debris were found at Saugatuck. A section of beach near Holland where debris was found is still called Alpena Beach.

Similarly named ships
Another ship named Alpena was a freighter built in 1874 and burned to the waterline in 1891. Another Alpena was a tugboat which sank in 1943 at Huron, Ohio.

SS City of Alpena was a paddlewheel steamboat operating between Detroit and Mackinac Island by the Detroit and Cleveland Navigation Company from 1893 to 1921.

There is also a Great Lakes ship named Alpena, formerly the Leon Fraser, owned by Inland Lakes Management, an affiliate of Lafarge. It is used as a bulk freighter to haul cement. It has a 15,550 ton capacity. It was renamed, shortened and converted to a bulk cement carrier in 1991. The Alpena is a moderate sized ship in the Great Lakes fleet; the largest Lakers are almost twice its length and breadth and carry four times its cargo. She is able to transit the canals of the St. Lawrence Seaway due to her small size.

See also
List of maritime disasters in the 19th century
List of storms on the Great Lakes
Sea Wing disaster

References

Citations

External links
 1880 Alpena sinking
 Michigan Shipwrecks.org - Alpena

Maritime incidents in October 1880
1866 ships
1880 in the United States
Ships lost with all hands
Shipwrecks of Lake Michigan
Missing ships
Ships built in Marine City, Michigan